Apocalypso is the second studio album by Australian electronic dance music duo The Presets. The album was released by record label Modular on 12 April 2008 in Australia, on 13 May in the United States, and 2 June in the United Kingdom. The album features the singles "My People", "This Boy's in Love", "Talk Like That", "Yippiyo-Ay", "If I Know You" and "Kicking and Screaming".

At the J Awards of 2008, the album won Australian Album of the Year.

Production 

After two years of non-stop touring, The Presets began production of Apocalypso in early 2007 by going to a farm in Byron Bay for two weeks. The duo had no songs written or any idea what the album would sound like before hitting the farm. Basing themselves in Berlin, the band continued work on the album while touring in Europe. The majority of the album was recorded by the band themselves at their own individual home studios. The songs were finished at a friend's studio and the album was mixed at BJB Studios in Sydney and at Seedy Underbelly in Los Angeles. The album was mastered at The Exchange in London.

Kim Moyes, describing the album, said "There is a few songs on Apocalypso that have been informed by our live shows in terms of their energy, after two-and-a-bit years of touring we really found out what we liked playing and what works well live, but the album as a whole however is not all bangers, there are some very delicate moments too." The group also wanted Apocalypso to be far more song-focused. Moyes told Rolling Stone Australia: "With [previous album] Beams, we didn't think too much about it. The more fucked up it was, the better. But now the vision’s been refined and instead of instrumentals, now we're like 'fuck, let’s just have killer songs.'"

In an interview with Australian national radio station Triple J, the band members discussed how they came up with the album's title, stating that it evolved from "Apocalypse Wow", a suggestion by Hamilton. "Y'know the idea of the apocalypse and a calypso together. Something very dark, very intense, you can't get much worse than an apocalypse. And then a calypso which is just super fun, like mojitos, steel drums."

Reception 

Apocalypso was the album that brought the Presets to mainstream audiences. The album debuted at number one on the ARIA charts, and achieved gold certification within two weeks. The album has since gone platinum. In October 2008, the album won the 2008 ARIA Awards for Best Dance Release and Album of the Year. By winning the ARIA for Album of the Year, Apocalypso became the first dance album to win the award. It also won the Artisan Awards for Best Cover Art (Jonathan Zawada) and Producer of the Year (The Presets), missing out on the award for Engineer of the Year (Scott Horscroft). It was also nominated for the Highest Selling Album in 2009. In December, the album won the J Award. In October 2010, it was listed in the book 100 Best Australian Albums.

Track listing

Singles 
 "My People"
 The first single released in late 2007. The song continued to climb the ARIA Singles Chart after successful performances, and heavy radio airplay. It peaked at number 14 on the ARIA Singles Chart, and certified Platinum despite never reaching the top 10.
 "This Boy's in Love"
 Released as the second single in early 2008, it peaked at number 23 early on, and continuous climbing and falling the single maintained sales. After the band's win at the 2008 ARIA Awards the song re-entered the top 50, and was certified Gold.
 "Talk Like That"
 Released as the official third single in September 2008, the song was a club hit, spending several weeks outside the top 20. When the band won at the ARIAs the song re-entered and climbed the charts to a new peak of number 19. A few weeks before falling out of the singles chart completely it was certified Gold.
 "Yippiyo-Ay"
 Released as a digital-only single, the song gained airplay week-by-week. It debuted at number 94 on the singles chart based on downloads alone, re-entering several times before peaking at number 72.
 "If I Know You"
 Speculated as the album's third single when it received substantial airplay, the official third single was announced as "Talk Like That". Peaking at number 57 on the singles chart in May 2009, the song charted on downloads alone. The song became the fifth single from Apocalypso, and was officially released on 27 March 2009.
 "Kicking and Screaming"
 Announced as the sixth single in late May 2009, a live video was released to accompany the radio release. Cover art then surfaced, but a physical release did not eventuate, making it the second digital-only single from the album.

"Anywhere" was also released in 2008 as a promotional single from the album.

Charts

Weekly charts

Year-end charts

Certifications

Personnel 

 Julian Hamilton – vocals, keyboards
 Kim Moyes – drums, keyboards
 Scott Horscroft – mixing
 John Fields – mixing
 Nilesh Patel – mastering
 Lyn Balzer – photography
 Anthony Perkins – photography
 Jonathan Zawada – art direction

References

External links 

 

2008 albums
ARIA Award-winning albums
Modular Recordings albums
The Presets albums